"Cold Irons Bound" is a Grammy Award-winning song written by Bob Dylan, recorded in January 1997 and released on September 30, 1997 as the eighth track on his album Time Out of Mind. The song was produced by Daniel Lanois.

Background and composition
Dylan was inspired to write the song in the studio after hearing drummer David Kemper, who had arrived early one day, playing an unusual beat. As Kemper explained in an interview with Uncut:

The song is performed in the key of B-flat major.

Critical reception 

Oliver Trager describes "Cold Irons Bound" as "biting" with "ricocheting guitar licks, rockabilly drums, distorted organ, and [a] voice floating in a blimp of its own echo", in which "one can still hear, to paraphrase "Visions of Johanna", the ghost of electricity howling from the bones of Dylan's face..." Greil Marcus of The San Francisco Examiner made note of the song's "whiplashed rhythm", while Mick Gold, in a retrospective piece for Rock's Backpages, highlighted the memorability of the track's "musique concrete bluesy clutter", saying "the musical noise is more memorable than the lyrics." AllMusic's Jim Esch said: "Thanks to Daniel Lanois's muddy, echo drenched production, 'Cold Irons Bound' sounds like it was mailed in from another time, decades ago from the midnight blue ether. Dylan's voice is at times overmatched by the thick sonic soup, but all the same, the feel is there, and the feel is gnarly, bluesy. Nasty guitars and drums clatter and shuffle overtop a bass riff while Dylan whips off acerbic couplets". Michael Gray also describes this song in detail:

Spectrum Culture included the song on a list of "Bob Dylan's 20 Best Songs of the '90s". In an article accompanying the list, critic Kevin Korber argued that the song is more interesting for the music, and Lanois' atmospheric production, than for Dylan's lyrics: "'Cold Irons Bound' is the ur-example of what Daniel Lanois could do with Dylan, a collaboration that started back with Oh Mercy but arrived in full form on Time Out of Mind. In contrast to the clear, compressed sounds that Dylan began the decade with, 'Irons' is incredibly murky, an echo-laden blues jam that sounds completely disassociated from this plane of existence. Dylan’s voice, by this point weaker and thornier than it had been at his peak, could have been lost in the studio ether, but it instead sounds haunted, a spectral song from a realm beyond ours".

A 2021 Consequence article ranking Dylan's top 15 albums placed Time Out of Mind seventh and cited "Cold Irons Bound" as the highlight. Critic Matt Melis wrote that it was "an agitated, pining, and paranoid album, and nowhere do those emotions register more tangible than on 'Cold Irons Bound'. Amid driving percussion and echoing dirt-road blues, Dylan fails to square a love and obsession that just can’t be reasoned with. This isn’t a tearful goodbye and gallop off into the sunset; this is a collision course that a desperate and broken man seems powerless to avoid. Like so much of Dylan’s turn-of-the-century work, there’s zero compromise to be found here. The wounds are deep, the pain is unbearable, and any possible consolation is blowin’ in the wind".

Other versions
Dylan performed the song in July 2002 for a concert sequence in the film Masked and Anonymous. This version was released on the film's soundtrack album in July 2003. It also appears in video form on the bonus DVD included in the Limited Edition version of Dylan's 2006 album Modern Times. Charlie Sexton, who played on this version of the song, called Dylan's re-arrangement of it "simply amazing". The Big Issue placed the Masked and Anonymous version at #46 on a 2021 list of the "80 best Bob Dylan songs - that aren't the greatest hits". An article accompanying the list noted that the "bemusing film Dylan wrote and starred in...delivered some storming live performances, including this version of the Time Out of Mind track".

A concert version, recorded in Los Angeles on Dec. 16, 1997, appeared on various "Love Sick" single releases in 1998, as well as on the compilation Live 1961-2000: Thirty-Nine Years of Great Concert Performances, released in Japan in 2001. A June 11, 2004 performance, from the Bonnaroo Music Festival, in Manchester, Tennessee, is included on the Deluxe Edition of Tell Tale Signs: Rare and Unreleased 1989–2006 (2008).

In popular culture
Dylan's original studio version of the song, as well as a cover by Television's Tom Verlaine, are prominently featured in I'm Not There, Todd Haynes's unconventional 2007 biopic of Dylan.

Live performances
Bob Dylan performed "Cold Irons Bound" 423 times on the Never Ending Tour between 1997 and 2011. The live debut occurred at Humphrey Coliseum in Starkville, Mississippi on October 24, 1997 and the last performance (to date) took place at Braehead Arena in Glasgow, Scotland on October 9, 2011.

Awards
 Grammy Award for Best Male Rock Vocal Performance (1998)

Notable covers
"Cold Irons Bound" has been covered by:
Druha Trava & Peter Rowan: New Freedom Bell (1999)
Tom Verlaine & The Million Dollar Bashers: I'm Not There (2007)

References

External links

Lyrics at Bob Dylan's official page
Chords at Dylanchords

Songs written by Bob Dylan
Bob Dylan songs
1997 songs
Song recordings produced by Daniel Lanois
Grammy Award for Best Male Rock Vocal Performance